Evgeny Yuryevich Matveev (born Penza, 15 April 1984) is a Russian rugby union player. He plays as a hooker and as a flanker.

He plays for VVA Saracens.

He has 55 caps for Russia, since 2007, with 10 tries scored, 50 points on aggregate. He was called for the 2011 Rugby World Cup, playing in two games and without scoring. He was a regular player in the Russia side that qualified for the 2019 Rugby World Cup in Japan.

References

External links
Evgeny Matveev International Statistics

1984 births
Living people
Russian rugby union players
Russia international rugby union players
VVA Podmoskovye players
Rugby union hookers
Rugby union flankers
Sportspeople from Penza